Sirius XM Turbo is a commercial-free music channel that plays 1990s and 2000s hard rock and airs on Sirius XM Radio and Dish Network. It airs on channel 41 on Sirius XM Radio.

History 
Turbo made its debut on August 17, 2017, as a full-time channel devoted to hard rock from artists like Metallica, System of a Down, Linkin Park and more.

PopRocks, which slots in on channel 17, plays lighter rock music from the 1990s and 2000s, a la Goo Goo Dolls, Train and Sheryl Crow; while Turbo, channel 41 (after a try-out as a streaming-only station), offers hard rock music from Linkin Park, Metallica and System of a Down.

Prior to August 17, the channel was on channel 314 as a US only Xtra Channel. This slot is now occupied by the now punk rock-exclusive formatted Faction which has been rebranded as Faction Punk, however it is available on both US and Canadian versions of the Sirius XM app.

On October 5, 2020, at noon EDT (16:00 UTC) until October 12, 2020, at 3:00 AM EDT (07:00 UTC), Turbo switched over to Linkin Park Radio in celebration of the 20th anniversary of their debut studio album, Hybrid Theory. The first song played on Linkin Park Radio was "One Step Closer", and the last song played was "Happy Song" by Bring Me the Horizon.

Selected artists played 
 A Perfect Circle
 Adema
 Audioslave
 Breaking Benjamin
 Buckcherry
 Chevelle
 Crossfade
 Deftones
 Disturbed
 Flyleaf
 Godsmack
 Gravity Kills
 Helmet
 Hinder
 Kid Rock
 Korn
 Limp Bizkit
 Linkin Park
 Marilyn Manson
 Metallica
 Mudvayne
 Nine Inch Nails
 Nonpoint
 Orgy
 Pantera
 Papa Roach
 P.O.D.
 Ra
 Rage Against the Machine
 Rammstein
 Rob Zombie
 Saliva
 Seether
 Sevendust
 Shinedown
 Slipknot
 Staind
 Stone Sour
 System of a Down
 Taproot
 Thirty Seconds to Mars
 Three Days Grace
 Tool
 White Zombie
 X-ecutioners

Hosts

References

See also 
 List of Sirius XM Radio channels

Decades themed radio stations
Sirius Satellite Radio channels
XM Satellite Radio channels
Radio stations established in 2017
Sirius XM Radio channels